Plakortis fromontae is a species of marine sponge in the order Homosclerophorida, first described in 2011 by Guilherme Muricy. The species epithet, fromontae, honours Jane Fromont.

Distribution
The holotype was collected off  Rat Island, Western Australia, in the  Houtman Abrolhos and the species is known only from that locality.

References

Homoscleromorpha
Animals described in 2011
Sponges of Australia
Taxa named by Guilherme Muricy